The Big South Fork Airpark is located 50 miles north of Knoxville, Tennessee, and includes a 5,500-foot long asphalt runway with three instrument approaches.  The airpark grounds include homesteads with taxiway access, personal hangars, and a maintenance facility.

Airpark 
Big South Fork Airpark is served by the adjacent Scott Municipal Airport. It is owned by Bill Armstrong.

Wings Over Big South Fork Air Show 
The airpark participates in the Wings Over Big South Fork air show every September. Attractions include aerial shows and a display of airplanes from eras ranging from World War I to modern fighter jets.

References

External links 
Big South Fork Airpark Community website

Airports in Tennessee
Residential airparks
Buildings and structures in Scott County, Tennessee
Transportation in Scott County, Tennessee